Socialist Workers' Party of China, was a political party, formed by Chinese workers in Russia in January 1919. Its founders were active in the Union of Chinese Workers.

References

1919 establishments in China
China
Communist parties in China
Defunct political parties in China
Political parties established in 1919
Political parties in the Republic of China
Political parties with year of disestablishment missing